Ants Tael (born 19 July 1936 in Tallinn) is an Estonian dancer and dance pedagogue.

He has been a member of the jury in television series Tantsud tähtedega.

In 2010, he was awarded with Order of the White Star, IV class.

References

1936 births
Living people
Estonian male dancers
Estonian choreographers
Estonian educators
Estonian television personalities
Tallinn University of Technology alumni
People from Tallinn